There are a number of Germans in Pakistan, consisting of German expatriates in Pakistan, students, families, dual national Pakistani-Germans and Pakistani citizens of German ancestry. Their number may be as much as 100,000 in entire Pakistan. There are Germans in Peshawar. Germany maintains a healthy diplomatic presence in the country, with an embassy in Islamabad, a consulate in Karachi and honorary-consulate in Lahore.

Militants in the Northwest 

There have been various reports of unregistered German militants living in the northwest regions of the country near Afghanistan. 

In 2009, intelligence investigators discovered a German "village" in Federally Administered Tribal Areas, consisting of hundreds of German al-Qaeda insurgents and Muslim converts. According to the German foreign ministry, a growing number of German families, especially of North African descent, have moved into those regions and live there. The village presents a desirable lifestyle with schools, hospitals, pharmacies and day care centres at a nearby distance.

Notable people
 Atif Bashir - Pakistani footballer of German-Turkish descent
 Peter Finke - German nuclear scientist based in Islamabad
 Elsa Kazi
 Ruth Pfau - Christian nun and social worker
 Esther Rahim

See also
 Pakistan German Business Forum
 Germany–Pakistan relations

References

External links
 Heinrich-Heine Sprachzentrum Islamabad

 
 
Pakistan
Immigration to Pakistan